Robert Mills is an American politician from the state of Louisiana. A Republican, Mills has represented the 36th district of the Louisiana State Senate, based in the exurbs of Shreveport and Bossier City, since 2020.

Mills is a vice president at Calumet Lubricants Company, where he has worked since 1993. In 2019, Mills successfully challenged incumbent Republican state senator Ryan Gatti, defeating him with 56% of the vote in the runoff election.

References

Living people
People from Shreveport, Louisiana
Republican Party Louisiana state senators
21st-century American politicians
Year of birth missing (living people)